Acentria is a monotypic moth genus of the family Crambidae described by James Francis Stephens in 1829. Its only species, Acentria ephemerella, the watermilfoil moth or water veneer, was described by Michael Denis and Ignaz Schiffermüller in 1775. It is used as an agent of biological pest control against the noxious aquatic plant known as Eurasian watermilfoil (Myriophyllum spicatum).

The adult male is a white moth with a wingspan of about 12 millimeters. There are two female morphologies. Most females are flightless and live on the surface of the water or just submersed. A few females have longer wings and fly. This is an aquatic insect; most of its life cycle takes place in the water. The female is fertilized at the surface and dives to lay egg masses on aquatic plants, such as watermilfoil. The larva emerges and bores into the stem of the plant, gluing together plant material to create a shelter. It girdles stems as it feeds, which causes significant damage to the plant as stems and leaves die or break off. The larva pupates inside an underwater cocoon filled with air. Upon emergence, males and flighted females swim to the water surface and fly away.

This moth is used as a biocontrol agent on watermilfoil, but carefully, because it lacks host specificity and will attack other plant species, including natives. It tends to prefer M. spicatum over other plants. This is a European moth, but it was found in Canada in the 1920s, having been probably introduced accidentally. It is established in much of the northeastern United States, where it appears to have the ability to reduce watermilfoil infestations.

References 

 Coombs, E. M., et al., Eds. (2004). Biological Control of Invasive Plants in the United States. Corvallis: Oregon State University Press, 171.

External links 

 Cornell Species Profile
 Photo gallery

Acentropinae
Monotypic moth genera
Biological pest control insects
Moths of Europe
Moths of North America
Taxa named by James Francis Stephens
Crambidae genera